Harwood is a crossroads in Anne Arundel County, Maryland, United States, south of Annapolis on Maryland Route 2 (Solomons Island Road).

Education
Southern High School is nearby. A small portion of high school students in Harwood also attend  South River High School in nearby Edgewater as well.

Historic structures
 Obligation
Larkin's Hill Farm
Larkin's Hundred

Notable people
 LeRoy Battle (1921–2015), music teacher and Tuskegee Airman
 Pete Stark (1931–2020), retired congressman
 Stan Stearns (1935–2012), photographer
 Thomas Noble Stockett (1747–1802), surgeon and Revolutionary War veteran
 Joseph Noble Stockett (1779–1854), 18th/19th century landowner
 George Washington (1732–1799), dined at Rawlings' Tavern.

References

External links
Harwood, MD   Community Profile
Historic places (National Register Listings)
Larkin's Hill Farm
Larkin's Hundred
Mary's Mount

Unincorporated communities in Anne Arundel County, Maryland
Unincorporated communities in Maryland